The 2020 Croatian Women's Football Cup was the twenty-ninth season of the annual Croatian football cup competition. Eleven teams participated in the competition, all eight teams from the 2019–20 Croatian Women's First Football League and three teams from second level that applied for competition. The competition started on 22 February 2020 and was scheduled to end on 31 May 2020. Split were defending champions. Viktorija, Osijek, Lepoglava, Katarina Zrinski and Dinamo Zagreb received bye to the quarter-finals. Due to ongoing COVID-19 pandemic, the last quarter-finals match was postponed indefinitely and ultimately not held.

Matches

Round of 16

Quarter-finals

References

External links
Competition rules 

2020 in Croatian women's sport
Women's football in Croatia
Football competitions in Croatia
Croatian Women's Football Cup, 2020